Begum Agha Zanganeh (fl. 1751) was the mother of shah Karim Khan Zand of Persia (r. 1751–1779). 

She was married to Inaq Khan Zand.  

She had a big influence during the reign of her son.

References

18th-century births
18th-century deaths
18th-century Iranian women
People of the Zand dynasty